Desert greening is the process of man-made reclamation of deserts for ecological reasons (biodiversity), farming and forestry, but also for reclamation of natural water systems and other ecological systems that support life. The term "desert greening" is intended to apply to both cold and hot arid and semi-arid deserts (see Köppen climate classification system). It does not apply to ice capped or permafrost regions. Desert greening has the potential to help solve global water, energy, and food crises. It pertains to roughly 32 million square kilometres of land.

Methods

Environmental remediation and ecoforestry 
 Planting trees (pioneer species) and salt-loving plants (halophytes), such as Salicornia
 Planting trees augmented by dew and rain harvesting technologies like the Groasis Waterboxx
 Regeneration of salty, polluted, or degenerated soils

Landscaping and green infrastructure 
 Ecoscaping; landscaping methods which reduce evaporation, erosion, consolidation of topsoil, sandstorms, and high temperatures
 Floodwater retention and infiltration (flood control)
 Urban sprawl which usually includes public and private greenspaces

Agriculture 
 Desert farming based on fossil groundwater, although not being sustainable
 Farmer-managed natural regeneration
 Greenhouse agriculture
 Holistic management
 Inland mariculture
 Managed intensive rotational grazing
 Permaculture in general – harvesting runoff rainwater to grow plant communities polyculture, composting or multitrophic agriculture
 Prevention of overgrazing
 Regenerative agriculture
 Seawater greenhouses and farming, for example, Seawater Foundation or the IBTS Greenhouse

Other 
 Prevention of firewood or charcoal use, respectively providing electricity for cooking

Water

Desert greening is substantially a function of water availability. If sufficient water for irrigation is at hand, any hot, cold, sandy or rocky desert can be greened. Water can be made available through saving, reuse, rainwater harvesting, desalination, or direct use of seawater for salt-loving plants. These different paths have unique features, i.e.: conserving water is a cheap solution. Reuse of treated water and the closing of cycles is the most efficient because closed cycles stand for unlimited and sustainable supply – rainwater management is a decentralized solution and applicable for inland areas – desalination is very secure as long as the primary energy for the operation of the desalination plant is available. Direct use of seawater for seawater agriculture is the most potent, only limited by the need for pumping up the water from sea level.

A novel type of desalination is done with the Sahara Forest Project. This project uses solar stills for the generation of the freshwater.
Another novel technique is cloud seeding, either by artificial means or through the action of cloud-seeding bacteria that live on vegetation (e.g. Pseudomonas syringae). 
Another, "atmospheric water generation" or air to water, uses dehumidification and is used by the military for potable water generation. However this technology uses 200 times more energy than desalination, making it unsuitable for large scale desert greening.

Water distribution

Once the fresh water or seawater has been attained in centralized systems it must be distributed. This can be done using dug canals or in some instances aqueducts (which are both the least attractive option since they allow much water to be evaporated), troughs (as used in the Keita Project), earthenware piping (semi-open or closed) or even underground systems i.e. qanāt.

Depending on the method of distribution of the water, it can then be provided on different methods to the plants. A costly solution (used only on pipes) is drip irrigation. Other methods are the use of wadis (basically V-shaped ponds dug in the earth) or by simply planting the trees in holes inside/over the water pipe itself. The tree's roots can then suck the water straight from the water pipe (used in qanāt, hydroponics, ...) A similar technique can be done with semi-open pipes (i.e. dug throughs in the Keita Project).

Side effects

The use of water is, however, not always without problems. Desert greening by the Helmand and Arghandab Valley Authority irrigation scheme in Afghanistan significantly reduced the water flowing from the Helmand River into Lake Hamun and this, together with drought, was cited as a key reason for the severe damage to the ecology of Lake Hamun, much of which has degenerated since 1999 from a wetland of international importance into salt flats.

Trees
A main component of desert greening is the planting of trees. Trees store water, inhibit soil erosion through wind, raise water from underlying aquifers, reduce evaporation after a rain, attract animals (and thereby fertility through feces), and they can cause more rain to fall (by temperature reduction and other effects), if the planted area is large enough.

All of the effects beneficial for desert-greening which trees offer can also be provided by buildings. Shading by buildings is an example for a passive effect, the pumping up of water from aquifers an example for an active effect achieved with buildings technology. An example for a building designed to offer all of the beneficial effects of natural forests in the desert is the IBTS Greenhouse.

Example
The soil of the Thar Desert in India remains dry for much of the year and is prone to soil erosion. High speed winds blow soil from the desert, depositing some on neighboring fertile lands, and causing shifting sand dunes within the desert, which buries fences and blocks roads and railway tracks. A permanent solution to this problem of shifting sand dunes can be provided by planting appropriate species on the dunes to prevent further shifting and planting windbreaks and shelterbelts. These solutions also provide protection from hot or cold and desiccating winds and the invasion of sand. The Rajasthan Canal system in India is the major irrigation scheme of the Thar Desert and is intended to reclaim it and to check spreading of the desert to fertile areas.

Prevention of shifting sand dunes is accomplished through plantations of Vachellia tortilis near Laxmangarh town. There are few local tree species suitable for planting in the desert region and these are slow growing. The introduction of exotic tree species in the desert for plantation has become necessary. Many species of Eucalyptus, Acacia, Cassia and other genera from Israel, Australia, US, Russia, Zimbabwe, Chile, Peru, and Sudan have been tried in the Thar Desert. Vachellia tortilis has proved to be the most promising species for desert greening. The jojoba is another promising species of economic value which has been found suitable for planting in these areas.

Sundrop Farms launched a greenhouse in 2016 to produce 15,000 tonnes of tomatoes using only desert soil and desalinated water piped from Spencer Gulf.

See also

 Afforestation
 Al Baydha Project
 Algerian Green Dam
 Arid Forest Research Institute
 Conquest of the desert exhibition
 Ecological engineering
 Fertilizer tree
 Global warming
 Great Green Wall (Africa) and Great Green Wall (China)
 Oasification
 Restoration ecology
 United Nations Convention to Combat Desertification
 Wadi Rum Consultancy
 Water crisis

References

External links
 "How to green the desert and reverse climate change"  Allan Savory,  TED talk, February 2013.
Greening the Desert II – Final
Animation of Desert Greening in Egypt with the IBTS Greenhouse LivingDesert Group

 
Greening
Desertification
Ecosystems
Land reclamation